Fu Kun-cheng (born 1951) is a Taiwanese politician.

Education
He studied law at National Taiwan University, and completed a doctorate in the subject at the University of Virginia.

Career
Fu taught as an associate professor at his alma mater, as well as National Chengchi University, Soochow University, Tamkang University, Chinese Culture University, and National Taiwan Ocean University. He was elected to the second National Assembly in December 1991, then contested the 1995 Taiwan legislative election for a seat on the Legislative Yuan as a New Party representative of Taipei County. Fu left politics in 2002, moving to China for a position at Xiamen University. He later taught at National Kinmen Institute of Technology and Shanghai Jiaotong University.

References

1951 births
Living people
Taiwanese legal scholars
New Party Members of the Legislative Yuan
Members of the 3rd Legislative Yuan
Taiwanese expatriates in the United States
University of Virginia School of Law alumni
Academic staff of the National Chengchi University
Academic staff of the National Taiwan University
National Taiwan University alumni
Taiwanese expatriates in China
Academic staff of Shanghai Jiao Tong University
Academic staff of Soochow University (Taiwan)
Academic staff of Tamkang University
Academic staff of the Chinese Culture University
Academic staff of Xiamen University
New Taipei Members of the Legislative Yuan